The Nash-Fortenberry UFO sighting was an unidentified flying object sighting that occurred on July 14, 1952, when two commercial pilots (William B. Nash and William H. Fortenberry) claimed to have seen eight UFOs flying in a tight echelon formation over Chesapeake Bay in the state of Virginia. 

UFOlogists say the pilots observation allowed for relatively precise measurements of the objects' motion and size when compared to known landmarks, and that the encounter was corroborated by several groups of independent ground witnesses. The case was listed in the U.S. Air Force's Project Blue Book as an "unknown."

Donald Howard Menzel in his book The World of Flying Saucers (1963) suggested some possible naturalistic explanations. He suggested that the pilots may have seen lights on the ground that were distorted by haze. He later suggested they may have seen fireflies that were trapped between the panes of glass in their cockpit window.

Skeptical researcher Steuart Campbell suggested the pilots UFO sighting was a mirage of Venus.

References

Further reading
Steuart Campbell. (1994). The UFO Mystery Solved. Explicit Books. 
James W. Moseley, Karl T. Pflock. (2002). Shockingly Close to the Truth: Confessions of a Grave-Robbing Ufologist. Prometheus Books.

External links
The Pilots' Tale at Saturday Night Uforia
"We Flew Above Flying Saucers", by William B. Nash and William H. Fortenberry, from True magazine, 1967

Accidents and incidents involving the Douglas DC-4
Alleged UFO-related aviation incidents
Government responses to UFOs
1952 in Virginia